Bibliography of George Bush may refer to:
 Bibliography of George H. W. Bush
 Bibliography of George W. Bush
 George Bush (biblical scholar)#Published works